WXRE-LP was a Religious formatted broadcast radio station formerly licensed to Danville, Virginia, serving a five-mile-wide area south of Chatham, Virginia. WXRE-LP was owned and operated by International Religious Society, Inc.

The station's license to cover was cancelled by the Federal Communications Commission at International Religious Society, Inc.'s request on July 7, 2011.

References

External links
 

XRE
X
Defunct radio stations in the United States
Radio stations established in 2003
Defunct religious radio stations in the United States
Radio stations disestablished in 2011
2003 establishments in Virginia
2011 disestablishments in Virginia
XRE-LP